A flatcar (US) (also flat car, or flatbed) is a piece of rolling stock that consists of an open, flat deck mounted on a pair of trucks (US) or bogies (UK), one at each end containing four or six wheels. Occasionally, flat cars designed to carry extra heavy or extra large loads are mounted on a pair (or rarely, more) of bogies under each end. The deck of the car can be wood or steel, and the sides of the deck can include pockets for stakes or tie-down points to secure loads. Flatcars designed for carrying machinery have sliding chain assemblies recessed in the deck.

Flatcars are used for loads that are too large or cumbersome to load in enclosed cars such as boxcars.  They are also often used to transport intermodal containers (shipping containers) or trailers as part of intermodal freight transport shipping.

Specialized types

Aircraft parts flatcars
Aircraft parts were hauled via conventional freight cars beginning in World War II. However, given the ever-increasing size of aircraft assemblies, the "Sky Box" method of shipping parts was developed in the late 1960s specifically to transport parts for the Boeing 747 and other "jumbo" jets of the time. The "Sky Box" consists of a two-piece metal shell that is placed atop a standard flatcar to support and protect wing and tail assemblies and fuselage sections in transit (originally, depressed-center or "fish belly" cars were utilized).

Boeing 737 aircraft have been shipped throughout the United States on special trains, including the fuselage.

Chaincars 

Flatcars with tie down chains, tie down straps or stake pockets

Bulkhead flatcars

Bulkhead flatcars are designed with sturdy end-walls (bulkheads) to prevent loads from shifting past the ends of the car. Loads typically carried are pipe, steel slabs, utility poles and lumber, though lumber and utility poles are increasingly being hauled by skeleton cars. Bulkheads are typically lightweight when empty. Since bulkheads are lightweight when empty, hunting can occur when the car is above . Hunting is the wobbling movement of the trucks on a freight car or a locomotive. If the wheels hunt against the rails for a period of time, there is a high risk of a derailment.

Centerbeam flatcars/lumber racks

Centerbeam flatcars, centerbeams, center partition railcar, or "lumber racks" are specialty cars designed for carrying bundled building supplies such as dimensional lumber, wallboard, and fence posts. They are essentially bulkhead flatcars that have been reinforced by a longitudinal I-beam, often in the form of a Vierendeel truss, sometimes reinforced by diagonal members, but originally in the form of stressed panels perforated by panel-lightening "opera windows", either oval-shaped (seen above) or egg-shaped. These flatcars must be loaded symmetrically, with half of the payload on one side of the centerbeam and half on the other, to avoid tipping over.

Heavy capacity flatcars

They often have more than the typical North American standard of four axles (one two-axle truck at each end), and may have a depressed center to handle excess-height loads as well as two trucks of three axles each (one at each end) or four trucks (two at each end) of two axles each, connected by span bolsters. Loads typically handled include electrical power equipment and large industrial production machinery.

Circus use

A circus train is a modern method of conveyance for circus troupes. One of the larger users of circus trains was the Ringling Bros. and Barnum & Bailey Circus (RBBX), a famous American circus formed when the Ringling Brothers Circus purchased the Barnum and Bailey Circus in 1907, merged in 1919, and closed permanently as a merged company in May 2017.

Remote control use
Some companies, such as CSX Transportation, have former wood-carrying flatcars rebuilt into platforms which mount remote control equipment for use in operating locomotives. Such platforms are fitted with appropriate headlights, horns, and air brake appliances to operate in the leading position on a cut of cars (i.e. coupled ahead of the locomotive).

Intermodal freight use 
 
With the rise of intermodal-freight-transport–specific cars, and given the age of most of these flats, numbers will decline over the next several years. Indeed, when the first well cars appeared, allowing double stacking, many container flats were re-built as autoracks. The few "new build" container flats are identifiable by their lack of decking, welded steel frame, and standard  length. One variant is the  car (which usually carries one large container as a load); these are actually re-built old boxcars. Common reporting marks are FEC, CP, SOO and KTTX. The ATTX cars, which feature non-sparking grips and sides, are built for hauling dangerous goods (ammunition, flammable fluids, etc.).

Spine car 

A spine car is a car with only center and side sills and lateral arms to support intermodal containers.

Trailer-on-flat car 

Like well cars, these usually come in articulated sets of five or three.

A longer TOFC (trailer on flat car) is usually an  car. In the past, these carried three  trailers which are, as of 2007, almost obsolete, or one large, two  or  trailers. As intermodal traffic grows, these dedicated flats are in decline. Most have been modified to also carry containers as well. One notable type is Canadian Pacific Railway's XTRX service—dedicated five-unit flats that only carry trailers.

Skeleton car 
Similar to the spine car except that it is designed to carry lumber or utility poles, a skeleton car is composed of a center sill and lateral arms only. No deck, sometimes no side sills and sometimes no end sills.

Idler flatcars 
In some marine services, the linkspan between a ferry or barge and its dock is very weak. In order to avoid loss of cargo or heavy locomotives, an old flatcar (which is usually the lightest car available) is used as a bridge between the locomotive on the dock and the cars on the ferry or barge.

Idler flatcars are also used in oversize freight service, as loads such as pipe often overhang the ends of most standard-sized flatcars. Empty flatcars will be placed on both ends of the loaded car. This protects the cargo ends from damage and ensures that the loads don't bind and damage the ends of adjacent cars.

Often a flat car is placed directly in front of a crane ("big hook") in order to:
 provide a way to remove a wrecked car from a crash site.
 provide a way to store new or removed rail from a work site.
 allow room for the crane's boom while in transit to and from a work site.

Idler flatcars are also used to mount one kind of coupler on one end and another kind on the other end. This is called a match wagon or a barrier vehicle.

See also

 Bogie bolster wagon
 Conflat
 Containerization
 Flatbed trolley
 Flatbed truck
 Intermodal container
 Rollbock
 Rolling highway
 Side stake
 Slate waggon 
 Transporter flatcar

References

External links 

 Rail car manufacturing
 Guide to Rail Cars 

Freight rolling stock